Witmer's Tavern, is an historic structure located in East Lampeter Township, Lancaster County, Pennsylvania, just east of U.S. 30 on Old Philadelphia Pike. This building known as Witmer's Tavern should not be confused with the other Witmer's Tavern more commonly known as the Conestoga Restaurant or Conestoga Inn located on Route 462 at Bridgeport just east of Lancaster City.

It is a large 2 1/2-story, rectangular blue limestone building. The original section was purportedly built about 1725, although no conclusive evidence proves this date, and was later was expanded in 1773. It was renovated in 1978. and was later operated as a bed-and-breakfast.

Until 2005, the property had two barns, but they were torn down after a significant portion of the property was sold to build town houses.

The property was sold in 2007 and the remaining stone structure was used as an antique shop. In 2017, ownership of the parcel transferred an investment group based in South Carolina. As of 2018, the property was in severe disrepair and had been for sale for an extended period of time. It finally sold on January 31, 2019.

It was listed on the National Register of Historic Places in 1978.

References

External links
 Historical Marker Database

Bed and breakfasts in Pennsylvania
Hotel buildings on the National Register of Historic Places in Pennsylvania
Commercial buildings completed in 1773
Hotel buildings completed in 1773
Buildings and structures in Lancaster County, Pennsylvania
1773 establishments in Pennsylvania
National Register of Historic Places in Lancaster County, Pennsylvania